Rubén Darío is a station on Line 5 of the Madrid Metro. It is located in Zone A.

The station was named after nearby Rubén Darío Plaza, which in turn was named after the Nicaraguan poet Rubén Darío.

References 

Line 5 (Madrid Metro) stations
Railway stations in Spain opened in 1970